Werner von Habsburg may refer to:
Werner I, Bishop of Strasbourg (c. 979-1028)
Werner I, Count of Habsburg (died 1096), great-great-great-great-grandfather of Rudolph I of Germany
Werner II, Count of Habsburg (died 1167), great-great-grandfather of Rudolph I of Germany